Rafiqul Alam may refer to:

 Rafique Alam (1929–2011), Indian politician
 Rafiqul Alam (cricketer) (born 1957), Bangladeshi cricketer
 Rafiqul Alam (singer), Bangladeshi singer